Miroslav Šulek (born 16 March 1993) is a Slovak cross-country skier. He competed in the 2018 Winter Olympics.

References

1993 births
Living people
Cross-country skiers at the 2018 Winter Olympics
Slovak male cross-country skiers
Olympic cross-country skiers of Slovakia
Sportspeople from Zvolen